The Yellow Sand Society, also known as Yellow Way Society, and Yellow Gate Society, was a rural secret society and folk religious sect in northern China during the 19th and 20th century. 

Inspired by millenarian ideas, the movement launched several uprisings against the late Qing Empire, the Republic of China, and the Chinese puppet states of Japan. The Yellow Sands were eventually suppressed by the Chinese Communist Party (CCP) in the second half of the 20th century.

History

Origins 
Similar to other secret societies in China, the exact origins and operations of the Yellow Sand Society are difficult to discern. Chinese secret societies occasionally changed names, and were highly decentralized, with several differently named branches operating as part of the same movement. Sometimes, completely unrelated groups also shared the same name. It is thus difficult to clearly differentiate between the secret societies. The Yellow Sands are known to have operated as "Yellow Way Society" for part of their existence and have also been equated with the "Yellow Gate Society", which was active in Jinan, Shandong. In turn, "Yellow Gate Society" served as an alternative name for the Yellow Spears, a sub-group of the Red Spear Society. Consequently, the Yellow Sands have been characterized both as offshoot and predecessor of the Red Spear Society. It has also been theorized that the Yellow Sand Society was connected to the White Lotus movement.

The Yellow Sands were already active in the late Qing Empire, having possibly emerged as rural self-defense movement in reaction to the gradual decline of the Chinese government and the subsequent rise of banditry and chaos. By the late 19th century, they flourished in the isolated Guan County, Shandong, at the border to Henan. The Yellow Sand Society would continue to be most active in the border area of Henan, Shandong, and Hebei for the rest of its existence. 

In 1908, peasants in eastern Henan banded together and organized themselves as the "Yellow Way Society" in opposition to the Qing government. Three years later, these peasants started an open rebellion in an attempt to support the Xinhai Revolution. They captured and plundered Taikang. They were defeated thereafter, with about 1,000 Yellow Way insurgents killed.

Republican China 

Following the collapse of the Qing Empire, the Yellow Way Society opposed the new Republican government. This was unusual, for most secret societies chose to cooperate with the new regime until the mid-1920s. Around 1919, a man calling himself "Chu the Ninth" appeared in Anyang County of northern Henan. Claiming to be the ninth-generation descendant of the Ming dynasty, he proclaimed himself Emperor of China with the era name "Great Brightness" (Daming). In doing so, Chu was supported by a local Yellow Way teacher. The two jointly declared that China had to be reunified under the "true dragon [rightful emperor]" and that only Yellow Way Society members would be spared in the coming armageddon; their insurgency against the government lasted three years and was finally suppressed by Republican militia and army forces. Thereafter the movement resumed calling itself the Yellow Sand Society and continued to organize rural communities to resist increasing taxation and government intrusion for the rest of the Warlord Era.

In course of the Kuomintang (KMT)'s Northern Expedition 1926–28, the power of the warlords in northern China weakened significantly. This prompted the Yellow Sands, alongside other rural groups like the Red Spears and Heavenly Gates, to seize large areas for themselves. For example, these three secret societies captured Cheng'an County in 1927 and proceeded to run the local government for several months. Although the secret societies were thus fighting the same enemies as the KMT, the latter regarded this development unfavorably. This was due to the KMT-led Nationalist government fearing that the Yellow Sands and other rural groups would hinder their own tax collections just as they had resisted the warlords' taxation.

The Yellow Sand Society also took part in the Chinese resistance against the Empire of Japan, which increasingly occupied Chinese territory in the 1930s. One branch of the movement was reorganized by its leader Chang Yin-tang into the "People's Anti-Japanese National Salvation Self-Defence Corps", based at Taocheng in southern Hebei. Another Yellow Sand faction launched an uprising against the East Hebei Autonomous Council, a puppet state of Japan, in July 1936. Led by an old Taoist priest, the Yellow Sands managed to defeat an East Hopei Army unit that was sent to suppress them in Miyun District, whereupon the Imperial Japanese Army mobilized to crush the uprising. By September, the Yellow Sand forces in Miyun had been defeated by the Japanese, with about 300 rebels killed or wounded in battle.

As peasant organization, the Yellow Sand Society was among the secret societies that also attracted the Chinese Communist Party (CCP)'s attention. In December 1942, CCP leader Li Ta-chang released a paper which detailed how Communist cadres should deal with rural secret societies, grouping them into three categories. The Yellow Sands were considered to be a "feudal organization" led by landlords, but also important potential allies in the war against the Japanese. Li argued that Communists should join the secret societies and covertly indoctrinate them, and only attack those groups that adamantly refused to adopt Communism. Over time, however, the Communists became increasingly frustrated with the secret societies' political conservatism and refusal to adopt Communist ideas, so that the CCP increasingly shifted from cooperating with the rural groups to undermining and dismantling them.

Suppression by the Communist Party 
With the CCP's victory in the Chinese Civil War and the People's Republic of China's establishment in 1949, the secret societies were seen as a political threat. As result, the CCP started to purge Mainland China of them, violently curtailing their activities. The Yellow Sand Society was consequently suppressed as a seditious "sect". Nevertheless, remnants of the movement remained active as late as 1980, when three peasants were arrested as purported Yellow Sands. They were accused of having planned a rebellion and the reestablishment of the Taiping Heavenly Kingdom, and reportedly resisted arrest. In the ensuing altercation, eight policemen were injured before the purported Yellow Sands were taken into custody. All were sentenced to unknown terms of imprisonment.

Beliefs 
The Yellow Sand Society, like many other Chinese secret societies, was inspired in its activities by millenarian, spiritual and romanticised monarchist ideas. Its members believed that they could become immune to gunfire through "magic and incantations", a belief that was widely shared among secret societies. Historian Elizabeth J. Perry noted that this conviction of invulnerability was "a powerful weapon for bolstering the resolve of people who possessed few alternative resources with which to defend their meager holdings". 

The Yellow Sands also aimed at the restoration of the Ming dynasty. This too was a common motive among Chinese secret societies, often expressed in the slogan "Oppose the Qing; restore the Ming". This slogan remained popular in rural areas even after the Qing dynasty's fall and was still widely used in the 1940s. The rule of the Ming dynasty represented an idealized time, and it was widely believed that a Ming restoration would result in a "reign of happiness and justice for all" under a "good sovereign".

See also

 Secret society

Notes

References

Bibliography 

 

 
 

 

 

Vigilantes
19th century in China
20th century in China
Second Sino-Japanese War
Chinese secret societies
Self-proclaimed monarchy